Paniki is a rural locality and the administrative center of Panikinsky Selsoviet Rural Settlement, Medvensky District, Kursk Oblast, Russia. Population:

Geography 

 Streets
There are the following streets in the locality: 1st Brigada, 3rd Brigada, 5th Brigada, 6th Brigada, 7th Brigada, Koptevka, Molodyozhnaya and Shelkovskaya (381 houses).

 Climate
Paniki has a warm-summer humid continental climate (Dfb in the Köppen climate classification).

Transport 

References

Notes

Sources

Rural localities in Medvensky District